Wanchai Pongsri (born 6 November 1963) is a Thai boxer. He competed at the 1984 Summer Olympics and the 1988 Summer Olympics.

References

1963 births
Living people
Wanchai Pongsri
Wanchai Pongsri
Boxers at the 1984 Summer Olympics
Boxers at the 1988 Summer Olympics
Place of birth missing (living people)
Asian Games medalists in boxing
Boxers at the 1982 Asian Games
Boxers at the 1986 Asian Games
Wanchai Pongsri
Wanchai Pongsri
Medalists at the 1982 Asian Games
Medalists at the 1986 Asian Games
Southeast Asian Games medalists in boxing
Bantamweight boxers
Wanchai Pongsri